Nature reserves in Poland cover a total area of , representing 0.53% of the territory of Poland. As of 2011, Poland has 1469 nature reserves.

By 1990 this increased to  (0.37% of the territory of Poland)  Their number has also expanded (in 2000 they numbered 1307). The area of nature reserves in Poland was highest around in 2008, when they approached .

Nature reserves in Poland are divided into: fauna (141), landscape (108), forest (722), peat-bog (177), flora (169), water (44), inanimate nature (72), steppe (32) and halophyte (4). Another division is into the regular and strict nature reserves; the strict ones see no human activity, whereas the regular one see limited maintenance.

According to Łonkiewicz, the first nature reserve on the Polish lands was the Pamiątka Pieniacka (near Lwów), 50 hectares large, established by count Włodzimierz Dzieduszycki in 1886. As Rąkowski also notes, that nature reserve is no longer in the borders of modern Poland (it is now in Ukraine), and the oldest nature reserve on modern Polish lands may be the Baranowiec Nature Reserve (Rezerwat przyrody Barnowiec) established in 1903. Boiński as well Łachowski et al. however note that the oldest preserve may be the Leon Wyczółkowski's Cisy Staropolskie Nature Preserve (Rezerwat przyrody Cisy Staropolskie im. Leona Wyczółkowskiego), whose establishment dates to 1827.

Some of the best known nature reserves in Poland include: Białowieża Forest Nature Reserve (Rezerwat przyrody Lasy Naturalne Puszczy Białowieskiej), Leon Wyczółkowski's Cisy Staropolskie Nature Preserve (Rezerwat przyrody Cisy Staropolskie im. Leona Wyczółkowskiego), Olszyny Niezgodzkie Nature Reserve (Rezerwat przyrody Olszyny Niezgodzkie), Modrzewina Nature Reserve (Rezerwat przyrody Modrzewina) and the Stefan Starzyński's Kabacki's Forest Nature Reserve (Rezerwat przyrody Las Kabacki im. Stefana Starzyńskiego).

Size of nature reserves by voivodeship
The voivodeship with the highest total number of nature reserves is the Masovian Voivodeship, and the lowest, the Opole Voivodeship. With regard to the total area, the highest is the Podlaskie Voivodeship, and the lowest is the Opole Voivodeship.

See also
 Protected areas of Poland

References

 
Nature conservation in Poland
Natural history museums in Poland
Protected areas of Poland
Parks in Poland